Yalta Mountain-Forest Nature Reserve is a protected nature reserve that covers the southwestern ranges of the Crimean Mountains, along the south coast of the Crimean Peninsula.  The reserve is in the administrative district of Yalta Municipality

Topography
The reserve stretches for about 40 km along the southern slopes of the mountainous southwest of the Crimean peninsula. At its widest it is about 23 km north-to-south. The borders do not extend down to the sea except in a few spots to the south. The slopes are steep, built on Triassic schist, overlaid by Jurassic limestone, and Quaternary loess on the ridges. 

The top of the ridge is a hilly plateau that varies in width from a few hundred meters up to 7 km.  The plateau holds karst caves and caverns.

Climate and ecoregion
At higher elevations in the mountains, temperatures are cooler and precipitation higher (up to 1,050 mm/year).

Flora and fauna
Approximately 75% of the reserve is forested.  The floral communities depend on the altitude, in four main zones.  From sea level to 400 meters, oak trees and Juniperus excelsa are most typical.  From 400 to 900 meters the dominant trees are Black European Pine (a subspecies of Pinus nigra, with stands of Sessile oak (Quercus petraea), ash and hornbeam.  From 900 to 1200 meters are various pine forests on the slopes, with beeches on the level areas.  Meadows steppes are found above 1200 feet.

Public use
As a strict nature reserve, the Yalta Reserve's primary purpose is protection of nature and scientific study.  Public access is limited: mass recreation and construction of facilities is prohibited, as are hunting and fishing.  The reserve does support environmental education, and maintains a number of "ecological trails" that are open to public hikers.
As with all reserves on the Crimean Peninsula, ownership is subject to dispute.

See also
 Lists of Nature Preserves of Ukraine (class Ia protected areas)
 National Parks of Ukraine (class II protected areas)

References

External links
 Boundaries of Yalta Nature Reserve on OpenStreetMap.org 

Protected areas of Ukraine
Nature reserves in Ukraine